A list of people who are from or have lived in Buffalo, New York.  Individuals are listed in alphabetical order by last name in each category. Residents of Buffalo are commonly referred to as Buffalonians.

Architects
Louise Blanchard Bethune (1856–1915)
Gordon Bunshaft (1909–1990), Pritzker Prize winner
Robert T. Coles (1929–2020)
William Harrison Folsom (1815–1901), designed the Manti Temple
E. B. Green (1855–1950)
James A. Johnson (1865–1939)
Duane Lyman (1886–1966)
Richard A. Waite (1848–1911)

Artists
Cory Arcangel (born 1978), new media artist
Jeffrey Jones (born 1946), actor
Timothy D. Bellavia (born 1971), children's author, illustrator and educator
Charles E. Burchfield (1893–1967), watercolor painter
Philip Burke (born 1956), caricaturist
John F. Carlson (1875–1947), American Impressionist 
Charles Clough (born 1951), painter
Tony Conrad (1940–2016), media artist
Steve Fiorilla (1961–2009), illustrator and sculptor
Frank Kelly Freas (1922–2005), science fiction and fantasy artist
Wilhelmina McAlpin Godfrey (1914–1994), painter, printmaker and fiber artist
Grace Knowlton (1932–2020), sculptor
Justine Kurland (born 1969), photographer
J. J. Lankes (1884–1960), illustrator, woodcut print artist, and author
Sylvia Lark (1947–1990), Seneca painter, printmaker
Robert Longo (born 1953), painter and sculptor
Asad Raza (born 1974), artist, producer, writer
Michael Ross (1955), artist
Spain Rodriguez (1940–2012), underground cartoonist
Milton Rogovin (1909–2011), documentary photographer 
Charles Rohlfs (1853–1936), actor, pattern maker, stove designer and furniture maker 
Paul Sharits (1943–1993), mixed media artist, filmmaker
Cindy Sherman (born 1954), photographer and film director
Chrysanne Stathacos (born 1951), print, textile, performance, and conceptual artist.
Tony Sisti (1901–1983), painter
Eugene Speicher (1883–1962), portrait, landscape and figurative painter
Tom Toles (born 1951), political cartoonist
William Simpson (portrait artist) (c.1818–1872) was an African American artist and civil right activist in the 19th century, known for his portraits.
Adam Zyglis (born 1982), editorial cartoonist

Authors and journalists
Marty Angelo, author 10 books
John Arcudi, comic book author
John Barth, novelist
Gary Barwin, Irish writer
Charles Baxter, author
Lauren Belfer, author
Wolf Blitzer, television journalist
Lawrence Block, crime novelist
Lucille Clifton, poet
Howard Bloom, publicist
Dale Brown, aviator and author
William Wells Brown, abolitionist and writer
Taylor Caldwell, author
J. M. Coetzee, South African writer
Angelo F. Coniglio, civil engineer and author
Burton Crane, financial journalist
Robert Creeley, poet
Marvin Farber, philosopher
Marian de Forest, journalist and playwright
Gregg Easterbrook, magazine journalist
Leslie Feinberg, author and transgender activist
Leslie Fiedler, literary critic
F. Scott Fitzgerald, novelist
Josh Fruhlinger (The Comics Curmudgeon)
Dawn Gallagher author, beauty and wellness expert
Alice Gerard journalist and peace activist
Loss Pequeño Glazier, poet (Electronic Poetry Center)
Frances Gillmor, folklorist, scholar, and novelist
Anna Katharine Green, poet and novelist
Terry Gross, radio personality
A. R. Gurney, playwright
Richard Hofstadter, historian
Karla F.C. Holloway, professor
Paul Horgan, historian and author
Elbert Hubbard, publisher
Bruce Jackson, scholar
Thomas Joseph, James Beard Foundation Award winner chef and video host
Emma May Alexander Reinertsen, writer, social reformer
John Kessel, sci-fi writer
Nancy Kress, sci-fi writer
Mabel Dodge Luhan, patron of the arts
Martha MacCallum, television journalist
Norman E. Mack (1856-1932), editor & publisher of the Buffalo Times, chairman of the Democratic National Committee
Steele MacKaye, playwright, theatrical producer
Marguerite Merington (1857–1951), author
Marion Juliet Mitchell, poet
Joyce Carol Oates, author
John Otto (radio personality) (1929–1999), radio talk show host
Laura Pedersen, journalist, novelist, playwright
Tim Powers, sci-fi writer
Ishmael Reed, poet, essayist
Tim Russert, television journalist
Joseph Sansonese, author
Ruben Santiago-Hudson, playwright, actor
Bob Smith (1952–2018), comedian and author
Fran Striker, creator of Lone Ranger and Green Hornet
Matt Taibbi, journalist
Doug Turner (1932-2018), executive editor of the Courier Express, Washington Bureau Chief of the Buffalo News, Olympic rower
Mark Twain, pen name of Samuel Langhorne Clemens, iconic author
Jane Meade Welch, journalist, lecturer
Stuart Cary Welch (1928-2008), author and curator of Indian and Islamic Art
Lanford Wilson, playwright
Bob Wojnowski, sports journalist
Julia Evelyn Ditto Young, writer

Bands, composers, and musicians
Laura Aikin (born 1964), operatic coloratura soprano
Michael Angelakos of Passion Pit, singer-songwriter, composer, record producer
Harold Arlen, prolific standards composer (500 + Songs), won Academy Award for Over the Rainbow
Benny the Butcher, rapper
The Bloody Hollies, band
Juini Booth, jazz double-bassist 
Buffalo Bills, barbershop quartet
Buffalo Philharmonic Orchestra (1934–present), classical orchestral symphony
The Bunny The Bear, band
Julie Byrne, singer-songwriter
Cannibal Corpse, band
Peter Case, singer-songwriter, guitarist
Ray Chamberlain, jazz guitarist, bassist
Johny Chow of Stone Sour, bassist
Stacy Clark, singer-songwriter
Willis Conover, jazz producer and broadcaster
Conway the Machine, rapper
Patrick Cowley, composer, recording artist
Cute is What We Aim For, band
Vic Dana, dancer and singer
Danimal Cannon, video game composer and performer
Lance Diamond, lounge singer and personality
Ani DiFranco, singer, guitarist, multi-instrumentalist, poet, songwriter
Julius Eastman, composer, pianist, singer
Every Time I Die, band
JoAnn Falletta, classical musician and orchestral conductor
Florian-Ayala Fauna, noise musician and music producer
Morton Feldman, composer
Lukas Foss, composer, pianist, conductor
Jackson C. Frank, folk musician
Charles Gayle, jazz saxophonist, pianist, bass clarinetist, bassist 
Girlpope, band
Pentimento (band), band
E. Ray Goetz, Broadway composer and producer and briefly brother-in-law to Irving Berlin
Goo Goo Dolls, band
Grabbitz, singer-songwriter
Green Jellÿ, band
Jim Hall, jazz guitarist, composer, arranger
Alan Heatherington, orchestra conductor
Ray Henderson, songwriter
Edna Indermaur, contralto singer
It Dies Today, band
Jackdaw, band
Rick James
Joe Public, band
Joe Kraemer, composer
Jordan Kyle, songwriter, producer, engineer
Lemuria, band
Mel Lewis, drummer, jazz musician, bandleader
John Lombardo, band 10,000 Maniacs and folk duo John & Mary)
David Lucas, composer
Gary Mallaber, drummer, percussionist, singer
Nicholas Mason, drummer
Brian McKnight, singer-songwriter, arranger, producer, musician
Don Menza, saxophonist, arranger, composer, session musician, jazz educator
Mercury Rev, band
Bobby Militello, jazz saxophonist and flautist 
Leon and the Forklifts, band
The Modernaires, 1940s vocal harmony group
Moe, band
Nina Morgana, soprano with the Metropolitan Opera
Gurf Morlix, vocalist, songwriter, record producer
NicePeter, comedian, musician, personality
Willie Nile, singer-songwriter
Sam Noto, jazz trumpeter 
Ookla the Mok, band
Tina Parol, singer-songwriter
Leonard Pennario, pianist, songwriter
Lucky Peterson, blues guitarist and keyboardist 
Kristen Pfaff of Hole (band), bassist, cellist 
Mary Ramsey, band 10,000 Maniacs and folk duo John & Mary)
Raven, late 60s rock band
The Reign of Kindo, band
The Road (group), late 60s early 70s rock Band 
Scary Chicken, band
Marc Scibilia, pop rock singer-songwriter 
Billy Sheehan, bassist
Paul Siebel, singer-songwriter
Harry B. Smith, writer, lyricist, and composer
Dr. Lonnie Smith, jazz organist
Snapcase, band
Joanie Sommers, 1960s&70s singer pop/jazz and standards
Alexis Spight, gospel musician
Spyro Gyra, jazz band
STEMM, band
John Stevens, classic pop singer
Stevie J., musician, record producer, songwriter, television personality
Elizabeth Swados, writer, composer, musician, theatre director
Stan Szelest, musician
Talas, 1970s–80s rock band
John Valby, musician, comedian
Grover Washington, Jr., jazz-funk / soul-jazz saxophonist
Cory Wells, singer Three Dog Night
Westside Gunn, rapper 
Patrick Wilson, drummer Weezer
Jack Yellen, lyricist, screenwriter

Business and industry
Robert Borthwick Adam, co-founder of Adam, Meldrum & Whiting
Joseph Dart, lawyer, businessman, and entrepreneur; creator of Dart's Elevator
William H. Donaldson, chairman of the U.S. Securities and Exchange Commission; Under Secretary of State for International Security Affairs; chairman and CEO of the New York Stock Exchange; and chairman, president, and CEO of Aetna
Joseph Ellicott, surveyor, city planner, land office agent, lawyer, and politician
William G. Fargo, co-founder of American Express Company and Wells Fargo
Anson Goodyear, president of the Great Southern Lumber Company
Charles W. Goodyear, co-founder of the Buffalo and Susquehanna Railroad, Great Southern Lumber Company, Goodyear Lumber Company, Buffalo & Susquehanna Coal & Coke Company, and the New Orleans Great Northern Railroad Company
Wilson Greatbatch, engineer and inventor who held more than 325 patents
Arthur Hayes, co-founder and former CEO of cryptocurrency exchange BitMEX
George A. Hormel, founder of Hormel Foods Corporation 
Jeremy Jacobs, chairman of Delaware North and owner of the Boston Bruins 
Sidney Janis, writer, art dealer, and collector; founder of Sidney Janis Gallery
John J. Kennedy, businessman and politician; New York State Treasurer from 1911 to 1914
Seymour H. Knox I, founder of the F. W. Woolworth Company
Seymour H. Knox II, chairman of the F. W. Woolworth Company
John D. Larkin, founder of the Larkin Company and Buffalo Pottery
Jon L. Luther, chairman and former CEO of Dunkin' Brands
Sherman J. Maisel, economist who served on the Board of Governors of the Federal Reserve System
Darwin D. Martin, businessman best known for the house he commissioned from Frank Lloyd Wright
John R. Oishei, co-founder of Tri-Continental Corporation
Ralph Peo, founder of Frontier Industries; chairman and CEO of Houdaille Industries
Pat Powers, film producer associated with Walt Disney
Robert E. Rich Sr., founder of Rich Products 
Chris Sacca, billionaire venture investor; founder of Lowercase Capital
Grace Carew Sheldon, journalist, author, editor, and businesswoman
Ellsworth Milton Statler, founder of Statler Hotels
Henry Wells, co-founder of American Express Company and Wells Fargo
John G. Wickser, president of the Buffalo German Insurance Company and the Buffalo Commercial Insurance Company
Robert G. Wilmers, former chairman and CEO of M&T Bank

Entertainers and actors
Stephanie Allynne, actress
Jacob Artist, actor
Nick Bakay, voice actor
Darrell Banks, singer
Christine Baranski, actress
Michael Bennett, choreographer and director
Amanda Blake, actress
John Wayne Bobbit, actor
Sorrell Booke, actor
David Boreanaz, actor
Kyle Chandler, actor
Katharine Cornell, actress
William Courtleigh, Jr., silent-film actor
Don Criqui, sportscaster
Andrew Dan-Jumbo, television personality
Jeffrey DeMunn, actor
Diane English, television producer
Agnes Ethel, 19th-century actress
Jeff Fahey, actor
Gary Farmer, actor
Morton Feldman, composer
William Fichtner, actor
Tom Fontana, screenwriter and producer
Vincent Gallo, actor and director
Nyakim Gatwech, model
Teddy Geiger, singer-songwriter
David Hampton, impostor who posed as Sidney Poitier's son in 1983, which inspired the play and film Six Degrees of Separation
Patrick Hasburgh, writer producer
Mark Hapka, actor, Days Of Our Lives
Edna Indermaur, classical singer
Marc Evan Jackson, actor
Rick James, singer-songwriter
Gloria Jean, singer and actress
Beverly Johnson, model
Jeffrey Jones, actor
Daniel Keem, Youtube celebrity
Rachael Lillis, voice actress
Wendie Malick, actress
Gary Mallaber, musician
Nancy Marchand, actress
Jesse L. Martin, actor
Bill Mazer, sportscaster
Brian McKnight, singer and actor
Kristen McMenamy, fashion model
Don Messick, voice actor
David Milch, screenwriter and producer
Greg Mullavy, actor
Chad Michael Murray, model and actor
Louis Mustillo, actor
Willie Nile, singer-songwriter
Chelsea Noble, actress
Joe Pera, comedian 
Suzie Plakson, actress, singer, writer and artist
John T. Raymond, stage actor
James Read, actor
Joey Reynolds, radio personality
Irene Rich, actress
Mark Russell, satirist
Talia Ryder, actress
John Rzeznik, musician
William Sadler, actor
John Schuck, actor
Dick Shawn, actor
Billy Sheehan, musician
Buffalo Bob Smith, star of Howdy Doody
Joanie Sommers, singer and actress
April Stevens, singer
Carrie Stevens, actress
Fran Striker, creator of The Lone Ranger
Nino Tempo, singer
Vola Vale, actress
A.J. Verel, actor, stunt coordinator
Paul C. Vogt, comedian
Peter Allen Vogt, comedian
Cory Wells, singer of Three Dog Night
Jessica White, model
James Whitmore, actor
Jack Yellen, lyricist
Z. Mann Zilla, rapper

Military
Danelle Barrett (born  July 20, 1967), retired U.S. Navy Rear Admiral. 
John Basilone (1916–1945), Medal of Honor recipient
John P. Bobo (1943–1967), Medal of Honor recipient
Thomas Crotty (1912–1942), only Coast Guardsman to be captured as POW during World War II
Charles N. DeGlopper (1921–1944), second World War recipient of Medal of Honor
Harold John Ellison (1917–1942), Navy Cross recipient
Herbert O. Fisher (1909–1990), chief test pilot for Curtiss-Wright
Frank Gaffney (1883–1948), Medal of Honor recipient
David Goggins (born 1975), Navy SEAL
Anson Goodyear (1877–1964), major general in the New York Guard
Simeon T. Josselyn (1842–1905), Medal of Honor recipient
Benjamin Kaufman (1894–1981), Medal of Honor recipient
C. Wade McClusky (1902–1976), United States Navy aviator
Harold C. Roberts (1898–1945), Colonel in the United States Marine Corps; recipient of three Navy Crosses
Adrian R. Root (1832–1899), Union brevet major general
John C. Sagelhurst (1841–1907), American Civil War recipient of Medal of Honor
Frederick E. Toy (1866–1933), Medal of Honor recipient, orderly to Theodore Roosevelt
Matt Urban (1919–1995), Medal of Honor recipient

Politics and law
Neil Abercrombie, Governor of Hawaii, Congressman
Shirley Chisholm, Congresswoman and presidential candidate
Frances Folsom Cleveland, First Lady of the United States
Grover Cleveland, 22nd and 24th President of the United States
William "Wild Bill" Joseph Donovan, Medal of Honor recipient and instrumental in creation of CIA
William Dorsheimer, U.S. Attorney, Lieutenant Governor and Congressman
Frank H. Easterbrook, judge
Abigail Fillmore, First Lady of the United States
Caroline Fillmore, second wife of Millard Fillmore
Millard Fillmore, 13th President of the United States
Manly Fleischmann, War Production Administrator during the Korean War, Chairman of N.Y. Gov. Nelson Rockefeller's Commission on Financing Public Education ( the "Fleischmann Commission")
James D. Griffin, Mayor of Buffalo 1978–93
Mark Grisanti, state senator
Isaac R. Harrington, Mayor of Buffalo
Kathy Hochul, 57th Governor of New York
Edwin Jaeckle, New York State Republican Party chairman
Jack Kemp, Secretary of U.S. Department of Housing and Urban Development, football player, Congressman, vice-presidential candidate
John J. LaFalce, U.S. representative
Frank J. Loesch, lawyer, organizer of Chicago Crime Commission
Donald Cyril Lubick, attorney and tax policy expert
Frank C. Ludera, indicted for an offence while he served in the Erie County Legislature from 1968–1971.
Salvatore R. Martoche, former U.S. Attorney, Appellate Court Judge, and Assistant Secretary of Labor.
Thomas McCarty, Wisconsin politician
Mohamed Abdullahi Mohamed, President of Somalia
Henry J. Nowak, U.S. Representative
Ajit Pai, FCC chairman
Carl Paladino, businessman and founder of the Taxpayers Party of New York
Tom Perez, former Secretary of Labor, head of the Democratic National Committee
Ely S. Parker, Commissioner of Indian Affairs under Ulysses S. Grant
Peter Buell Porter, U.S. Secretary of War 1828–29
John Roberts, 17th Chief Justice of United States
Winifred C. Stanley, first person to introduce equal pay legislation in United States
Angela Stanton-King, Georgia Congressional candidate
Peter J. Tropman, Wisconsin politician
Col. John B. Weber, Congressman

Religion, charities, social advocacy
Marty Angelo, minister, author, television producer, record promoter, disk jockey, restaurant/nightclub owner and band manager
Nelson Baker, Roman Catholic priest and church administrator 
Rosalie Bertell, scientist, author, environmental activist, and epidemiologist
Molly Burhans, Catholic Environmentalist, Cartographer, UN Young Champion of the Earth
Harry Emerson Fosdick, pastor and central figure in the "Fundamentalist–Modernist Controversy" within American Protestantism
Kevin Gaughan, attorney and government reform advocate
Anson Goodyear, philanthropist and first president of the Museum of Modern Art in New York City
Katharine Martha Houghton Hepburn, suffragist and birth control advocate
Isaac Klein, prominent rabbi and halakhic authority within Conservative Judaism.
Sister Karen Klimczak, member of the Sisters of St. Joseph
Maggie Kuhn, founder the Gray Panthers movement
Henry Moxley, African-American businessman, religious leader and activist
Marvin Opler, anthropologist and social psychiatrist
Morris Opler, anthropologist and advocate of Japanese American civil rights
Stanley Spisiak, "Mr Buffalo River", conservationist and environmental activist
Red Jacket, Native American Seneca orator and chief of the Wolf clan
Mary Burnett Talbert, African-American activist, suffragist and reformer
Margit Slachta, founder of the Sisters of Social Service

Science and technology
Willis Carrier, inventor of modern air conditioning
Sidney Farber, considered the father of modern chemotherapy
Genevieve Grotjan Feinstein, mathematician and cryptanalyst, helped crack the Japanese cipher machine during WWII
Edward Gibson, NASA astronaut, pilot, engineer, and physicist
Wilson Greatbatch, inventor of the Cardiac pacemaker
Herbert Hauptman, Nobel Laureate
Herman Hollerith, founder of The Tabulating Machine Company that later became IBM
Bruce Kershner, environmentalist and author
Chad Myers, meteorologist
Roswell Park, physician
James Pawelczyk, NASA researcher
Alfred Southwick, inventor of the electric chair
Sargur N. Srihari, computer scientist
Cliff Stoll, astronomer, author and teacher
Craig Venter, founder of Celera Genomics, The Institute for Genomic Research, and the J. Craig Venter Institute
Jeffrey Wigand, tobacco industry whistleblower

Sports
Kevyn Adams, hockey player & current general manager of the Buffalo Sabres
Adrian Adonis, professional wrestler
Josh Johnson, Major League Baseball player.
Anita Alvarez, Olympic synchronized swimmer
Matt Anderson, volleyball player
Jimmy Arias, tennis player
Justin Bailey, ice hockey player
Tom Baker, bowler
Beth Phoenix, professional wrestler
Dick Beyer, profesional wrestler
Edward "Ed" Book, basketball player
Damone Brown, basketball player
Jack Brownschidle, hockey player
Jim Burt, football player
Al Cervi, basketball player and coach
Steven Coppola, Olympic rower
Jon Corto, football player
Don Curtis, professional wrestler
Jim Dombrowski, football player
Brian Dux, basketball player
Joe Ehrmann, football player
Rashad Evans, mixed martial artist
Jeffrey Float, Olympic swimmer
Jonny Flynn, basketball player
Marcus Foligno, hockey player
Nick Foligno, hockey player
Daniel Garcia, professional wrestler
Dennis Gilbert, hockey player
David Goggins, ultrarunner and former pull-up world record holder
Corey Graham, football player 
Rob Gronkowski, football player
Paul Harris, basketball player
Lazar Hayward, basketball player
Orel Hershiser, baseball pitcher
Joe Hesketh, baseball pitcher
Dave Hollins, baseball player
Bill Hunter, baseball player 
Ron Jaworski, football player
Patrick Kaleta, hockey player
Patrick Kane, hockey player
Jim Kelly, football player, settled in Buffalo after playing for the Buffalo Bills
Chad Kelly, football player, nephew of Jim
Jack Kemp, football player and politician
Tim Kennedy, hockey player
Seymour H. Knox III, NHL owner
Todd Krygier, hockey player
Christian Laettner, basketball player
Mike Lalor, NHL hockey player and Stanley Cup winner in 1986
Bob Lanier, basketball player
Mark Lewin, professional wrestler
Lex Luger, professional wrestler
Sal Maglie, baseball pitcher
Don Majkowski, football player
Tom Makowski, baseball player 
Mike Mamula, football player
Carol Mann, golfer
Todd Marchant, hockey player
Phil McConkey, football player
Marc Mero, professional wrestler
Joe Mesi, boxer
Steve Mesler, Olympic bobsled gold medalist
Aaron Miller, hockey player
Matvey Natanzon, backgammon player
Paul Noworyta, professional vert skater
Jordan Nwora, basketball player
Greg Oden, basketball player
Brooks Orpik, hockey player
Alexi Salamone, sled hockey player
Adam Page, sledge hockey player
Tommy Paul, boxer
Ron Pitts, football player
Kevin Quick, hockey player
Emily Regan, Olympic rowing gold medalist 
Clifford Robinson, basketball player
Otto Roehm, Olympic freestyle wrestler
Naaman Roosevelt, football player
Buddy Rosar, baseball player
Trevor Ruffin, basketball player
Roy Saari, Olympic swimmer
Hayley Scamurra, hockey player
Peter Scamurra, hockey player
Philippe Sauvé, hockey player
Cole Schneider, hockey player
The Silent Warrior, professional wrestler
Michael Sisti, hockey coach
Jimmy Slattery, boxer
Warren Spahn, baseball pitcher
James Starks, football player
Lee Stempniak, hockey player
Loren Stokes, basketball player
Josh Thomas, football player
A.J. Verel, kickboxer, martial artist
James Watson, professional wrestler
Ward Wettlaufer, golfer
John Wildhack, Syracuse University athletic director
Jesse Winker, baseball player
Mary Wittenberg, marathon official
Craig Wolfley, football player
Ron Wolfley, football player, radio personality
John Wyatt, Negro league baseball player
Miles Wood, NHL hockey player

Other
Joseph Christopher (1955–1993), serial killer
Anne-Imelda Radice (born 1948), art historian and curator

See also 
 List of mayors of Buffalo, New York

References 

Buffalo, New York
Buffalo
Buffalo, New York-related lists